Jharkhand Disom Party was a political party in India. The party was founded 2002 by Bharatiya Janata Party  Member of Parliament Salkhan Murmu. The party works for the rights of the Adivasi peoples. For example, the party works for more quotas and reservations for Adivasis.

In 2003, JDP launched the Jharkhand Front together with four other parties, namely Jharkhand People's Party, Jharkhand Party (Naren), Jharkhand Party (Horo) and Jharkhand Vikas Dal.

In the Lok Sabha elections in 2004, the JDP launched four candidates from West Bengal, two from Bihar and one from Jharkhand.

Jharkhand Disom Party supports Raj Thackeray's Maharashtra Navnirman Sena's agitations against North Indians in Maharashtra.

In August 2014, Salkhan Murmu merged his Jharkhand Disom Party into the BJP in presence of former Jharkhand Chief Minister Arjun Munda.

References

External links
Election result 2004

Political parties in Jharkhand
Political parties established in 2002
Indian Hindu political parties
2002 establishments in Jharkhand
Bharatiya Janata Party breakaway groups